Kharaq (also Romanized as Kharq; also known as Darreh-ye Palangābād) is a village in Sangar Rural District, in the Central District of Faruj County, North Khorasan Province, Iran. At the 2006 census, its population was 1,110, in 358 families.

References 

Populated places in Faruj County